Joep Zweegers (born 25 August 1992) is a Dutch footballer who plays for Belgian side Esperanza Neerpelt.

Career
Zweegers joined Helmond Sport at the age of 18 on a one-year deal to go through the ranks but when his contract expired he decided to join FC Eindhoven on a-three year deal in July 2011.

FC Eindhoven
Zweegers debut came 8 months later coming on as a 90th minute substitute in a 3-1 away win against Go Ahead Eagles. He played 6 league games in his first season playing for FC Eindhoven. In his second season, he started the second match of the season which ended in a 2-1 for FC Eindhoven, his second game of the season came three months later in a 3-0 away loss against FC Dordrecht. In his second season, he played 12 games taking his total to 18 games in 2 years. In the 2013/14 season, Zweegers entered the last 12 months of his contract.  He has currently played four games this season that takes his total to 22 league games in almost three years. In the January 2014, he left FC Eindhoven after having no prospect of playing in the first team. He signed with Belgian side Esperanza Neerpelt.

References

External links
 Voetbal International profile 

1992 births
Living people
Dutch footballers
Association football defenders
FC Eindhoven players
Eerste Divisie players
People from Geldrop
Footballers from North Brabant